The Hana Bank Vietnam Masters was a professional golf tournament on the Asian Tour. It was played for the first time in November 2007 at the Phoenix Golf Resort in Vietnam, with a prize fund of US$500,000. In the second year it was played at the Vietnam Golf and Country Club, the nearest golf course to Ho Chi Minh City.

Winners

External links
Coverage on the Asian Tour's official site

Former Asian Tour events
Golf in Vietnam